Vladimir Jankélévitch (31 August 1903 – 6 June 1985) was a French philosopher and musicologist.

Biography
Jankélévitch was the son of Russian Jewish parents, who had emigrated to France.
In 1922 he started studying philosophy at the École normale supérieure in Paris, under Professor Bergson. In 1924 he completed his DES thesis (roughly equivalent to an MA thesis) on Le Traité : la dialectique. Ennéade I 3 de Plotin under the direction of Émile Bréhier.

He returned to France in 1933, where he taught at the Lycée du Parc in Lyon and at many universities, including Toulouse and Lille. In 1941 he joined the French Resistance. After the war, in 1951, he was appointed to the chair of Moral Philosophy at the Sorbonne (Paris I after 1971), where he taught until 1978.

In May 1968, he was among the few French professors to participate in the student protests.

The extreme subtlety of his thought is apparent throughout his works where the very slightest gradations are assigned great importance.

Bibliography 
 1931: Henri Bergson (tr. into Italian, Brescia, Morcelliana, 1991. tr. into English, Nils F. Schott, 2015)
 1933: L'Odyssée de la conscience dans la dernière philosophie de Schelling
 1933: Valeur et signification de la mauvaise conscience
 1936: La Mauvaise conscience (tr. into Italian, Bari, Dedalo, 2000; tr. into English, Andrew Kelly, 2015)
 1936: L'Ironie ou la bonne conscience (tr. into Italian, Genova, Il melangolo, 1988; tr. into Serbian, Novi Sad, 1989; tr. into German by Jürgen Brankel, Frankfurt a. M., Suhrkamp, 2012)
 1938: L'Alternative
 1938: Gabriel Fauré, ses mélodies, son esthétique
 1939: Ravel (tr. into German by Willi Reich, Reinbek, Rowohlt, 1958; tr. into English by Margaret Crosland, NY-London, 1959; tr. into Italian by Laura Lovisetti Fua, Milano, Arnoldo Mondadori Editore, 1962)
 1942: Du mensonge (tr. into Italian by Marco Motto, Milano, Raffaello Cortina, 2000; tr. into German "Von der Lüge", Berlin, Parerga Verlag GmbH, 2004)
 1947: Le Mal (tr. into Italian by Fernanda Canepa, Genova, Marietti, 2003)
 1949: Traité des vertus (tr. into Italian by Elina Klersy Imberciadori, Milano, Garzanti, 1987)
 1950: Debussy et le mystère de I'instant
 1954: Philosophie première introduction à une philosophie du Presque (tr. into German by Jürgen Brankel, Vienna, Turia + Kant, 2006)
 1956: L'Austérité et la Vie morale
 1957: Le Je-ne-sais quoi et le presque-rien
 1960: Le Pur et l'impur
 1961: La Musique et l'Ineffable, (tr. into Serbian by Jelena Jelić, Novi Sad, 1987; tr. into Italian by Enrica Lisciani-Petrini, Milano, Bompiani, 1998 ; tr. into English by Carolyn Abbate, 2003; tr. into Dutch by Ronald Commers, Gent Belgie, 2005)
 1963: L'Aventure, l'Ennui, le Sérieux (tr. into Italian by Carlo Alberto Bonadies, Genova Marietti, 1991)
 1966: La Mort (tr. into Bosnian by Almasa Defterdarević-Muradbegović, Sarajevo, 1997; tr. into German by Brigitta Restorff, Frankfurt a. M., Suhrkamp, 2005; tr. into Italian Torino, Einaudi, 2009; tr. into Croatian, Zagreb, AGM, 2011) – 
 1967: Le pardon, (tr. into Italian by Liana Aurigemma, Milano, IPL, 1969; tr. into English as Forgiveness by Andrew Kelley, 2005)
 1968: Le Sérieux de l'intention
 1970: Les Vertus et l'Amour'''
 1971: L 'Imprescriptible, (a section ("Pardonner?") of which is translated into English by Ann Hobart as "Should We Pardon Them?," Critical Inquiry, 22, Spring 1996; tr. into Italian by Daniel Vogelmann, "Perdonare?", Firenze, Giuntina, 1987; tr. into German by, Claudia Brede-Konersmann, "Das Verzeihen", Frankfurt a. M., Suhrkamp, 2003)
 1972: L'Innocence et la méchanceté 1974: L'Irréversible et la nostalgie 1978: Quelque part dans l'inachevé, en collaboration avec Béatrice Berlowitz (tr. into German by Jürgen Brankel, Vienna, Turia + Kant, 2008)
 1980: Le Je-ne-sais-quoi et le presque rien (tr. into Italian by Carlo Alberto Bonadies, Genova, Marietti, 1987; tr. into German by Jürgen Brankel, Vienna, Turia + Kant, 2009)
 1981: Le Paradoxe de la morale (tr. into Italian by Ruggero Guarini, Firenze, Hopefulmonster, 1986; tr. into Croatian by Daniel Bućan, Zagreb, AGM, 2004)

 Posthumous publications
 1994 Penser la mort? Entretiens'', recueil établi par F. Schwab, Paris, Liana Levi (tr. into Italian, Milano, Raffaello Cortina, 1995; tr. into German by Jürgen Brankel, Vienna, Turia + Kant, 2003)

Notes

References
Biography at jankelevitch.fr

Jews in the French resistance
Jewish philosophers
Jewish musicologists
Lille University of Science and Technology alumni
Academic staff of the Lille University of Science and Technology
Academic staff of the University of Paris
French people of Russian-Jewish descent
École Normale Supérieure alumni
20th-century French philosophers
Writers from Bourges
1903 births
1985 deaths
Irony theorists
20th-century French musicologists
Ravel scholars